"Garden" is a song by English electronic music producer and DJ Totally Enormous Extinct Dinosaurs, featuring vocals by Luisa Gerstein. The track was released in the United Kingdom on 14 October 2011 as the second single from his debut studio album, Trouble (2012). The song was written by Higginbottom and Gerstein and produced by Higginbottom.

Commercial use
Nokia used this song between 2011 and 2012 in advertising their first-generation Lumia line of smartphones.

Track listing

Chart performance

Release history

References

2011 singles
2011 songs
Totally Enormous Extinct Dinosaurs songs
Songs written by Totally Enormous Extinct Dinosaurs